The Redmi K60 is a series of Android-based smartphone manufactured by Xiaomi. These phones were announced on December 27, 2022.

References 

Android (operating system) devices
K60
Mobile phones with multiple rear cameras
Mobile phones with 4K video recording
Mobile phones introduced in 2022